William Henry Mahony (9 February 1856 – 26 July 1918) was an Australian politician.

He was born in Adelaide to builder Timothy Mahony and Elizabeth Johns. He was educated at Sydney Grammar School and was articled as a solicitor's clerk to Robert Burdett Smith in 1877. In 1882 he was admitted to practice as a solicitor. In 1894 he was elected to the New South Wales Legislative Assembly as the Free Trade member for Annandale. He held his seat until 1910, when he retired from politics. Mahony died at Glebe Point in 1918.

References

 

1856 births
1918 deaths
Free Trade Party politicians
Members of the New South Wales Legislative Assembly